Kuala Terengganu Drawbridge (Malay: Jambatan Angkat Kuala Terengganu, Jawi: جمبتن اڠكت كوالا ترڠڬانو) is a bascule bridge (commonly referred to as a 'drawbridge') in Kuala Terengganu, Terengganu, Malaysia, which crosses the mouth of Terengganu River. The bridge is the fourth bridge in Kuala Terengganu City area that straddles the river after Sultan Mahmud Bridge, Manir Bridge, and Pulau Sekati Bridge.

Overview 
Kuala Terengganu Drawbridge is a part of the projects for the East Coast Economic Region (ECER). It is the first drawbridge built in Malaysia and Southeast Asia, constructed by Zelan Construction Sdn Bhd with a cost of RM248 million. The construction of the bridge started in August 2014 and was completed in mid-2019. This drawbridge is also a component in the development of Kuala Terengganu City Centre (KTCC).

Design 

Its design was inspired by London Tower Bridge in London. The drawbridge has a 23-metre-wide single-carriageway that spans 638 metres over the mouth of Terengganu River. It connects Muara Selatan (South Bank), a reclaimed area in Kuala Terengganu city centre, near Tanjung, and Muara Utara (North Bank) in Seberang Takir. It has a 12.5-metre clearance above water when the double-leafed span is closed. The clear span of the drawbridge is 50 metres long.

There are four 15-storey, 89.1 metres high towers, with each set of two towers connected by a skybridge. The towers contained with lobbies that allow visitors to go up to the commercial areas located at the sky bridges. At night, the structures are lit up with colourful illuminations. The drawbridge allows users to cut their travelling time between Sultan Mahmud Airport as well as Universiti Malaysia Terengganu and Kuala Terengganu by about 15 minutes. A four-lane coastal road was built to connect the bridge with Kuala Nerus.

Opening 

The bridge was opened for trial from 2 to 17 June, during the Aidilfitri festive season. After a short closing period to allow other tests and improvement work to be carried out, it was fully opened for motor vehicles and pedestrians on 1 August 2019.

See also 
 Sultan Mahmud Bridge
 Pulau Sekati Bridge
 Ampera Bridge - a similar bridge in Indonesia

References 

Bridges completed in 2019
Bridges in Terengganu
Kuala Terengganu